Oroperipatus multipodes is a species of velvet worm in the Peripatidae family. This species has 33 pairs of legs. The type locality is in Colombia.

References

Onychophorans of tropical America
Onychophoran species
Animals described in 1913